Knuckleheads (original French-language title: Au pays des Têtes à claques) is a Canadian animated series based on Têtes à claques. The show first aired on Télétoon la nuit on January 12, 2012 as a preview, with regular airings starting on March 1, 2012.

The English-language version of the show has aired in English-speaking Canada (originally considered for broadcast in the United States as well), and was in production from the winter of 2012. This version premiered on Adult Swim on January 8, 2016. It also began airing on Teletoon at Night on June 6, 2016.

References

External links

2012 Canadian television series debuts
2010s Canadian adult animated television series
2010s Canadian animated comedy television series
Canadian adult animated comedy television series
English-language television shows
Teletoon original programming
Television shows set in Montreal